The first cabinet of Abdullah al-Thani was in power from 11 March until 29 August 2014, when it resigned so that the newly elected House of Representatives could create a new government.

See also

Second Al-Thani Cabinet

References

Cabinets established in 2014
2014 establishments in Libya
Second Libyan Civil War
Government of Libya
Political history of Libya